Oechsen is a municipality in the Wartburgkreis district of Thuringia, Germany.

It is located 7km north west of Dermbach, close to the Baier nature reserve. It takes its name from the Oechse river. 

The main landmark is the Lutheran church, dedicated to St Laurence.

References

Wartburgkreis